HMS Suffolk, pennant number 55, was a  heavy cruiser of the Royal Navy, and part of the Kent subclass. She was built by Portsmouth Dockyard, Portsmouth, UK, with the keel being laid down on 30 September 1924. She was launched on 16 February 1926, and commissioned on 31 May 1928. During the Second World War, Suffolk took part in the Norwegian Campaign in 1940 and then the  Battle of the Denmark Strait in 1941, before serving in the Arctic throughout the following year. After a refit that concluded in April 1943, the cruiser served in the Far East until the end of the war. In the immediate post-war period, Suffolk undertook transport duties between the Far East, Australia and the United Kingdom before being placed in reserve in mid-1946. The vessel was sold off and then scrapped in 1948.

History

Pre-World War II
Suffolk, like her sisters, served on the China Station, save for reconstruction, until the outbreak of the Second World War. In early 1934 she became the flagship of the China Station when Admiral Sir Frederick Dreyer dispatched Kent for a refit in the United Kingdom. She returned home to Portsmouth in July 1935 laden with 100 cases of "priceless" Chinese artifacts for an exhibition at the Royal Academy of Arts. The transfer and exhibition were overseen by Dr C W Cheng from the Chinese Embassy in London and other Chinese officials.

Norwegian Campaign

Suffolk came home in 1939 and after the outbreak of the Second World War patrolled the Denmark Strait in October 1939. In April 1940 she participated in the Norwegian Campaign. On 13 April 1940 the ship arrived at Tórshavn to commence the British pre-emptive occupation of the Faroe Islands.

The operation had little effect and the retaliation from German bombers severely damaged the aft of the ship, forcing her to return to Scapa Flow. Suffolk was out of action from April 1940 until February 1941 while she was repaired at the Clyde. The ship was at this time part of the 4th Cruiser Squadron.

Battle of the Denmark Strait

Suffolk had engaged the battleship twice during the battle, firing several salvoes on her. Using her radar, Suffolk was able to track the Bismarck through the Denmark Strait and maintained contact long enough for other units to vector into Bismarcks path. During the battle the battlecruiser Hood was sunk with heavy loss of life and the battleship Prince of Wales was damaged and forced to retreat. Afterwards Bismarck managed to elude Suffolk and Norfolk, which had been shadowing her, by making a 270° turn behind their wakes, and because Bismarck was losing oil, she attempted to reach Brest, France but was later sighted by an RAF Catalina and eventually sunk by heavy units of the Royal Navy.

Later career

After her repairs Suffolk served with the Home Fleet in Arctic waters until the end of 1942, then underwent a refit between December 1942 and April 1943 when "X" turret was removed and replaced with additional AA guns. On completion of this the ship was ordered to the Eastern Fleet, operating in the Indian Ocean until the end of the war.

From 26 August 1945 Suffolk was used to transport military and civilian personnel from Australia, and the Far East, back to the UK. On her return Suffolk underwent repairs at Chatham Dockyard between November 1945 and January 1946. On completion she sailed to Australia again, returning in April 1946. Her final voyage was to Singapore arriving there in May, and returning in July 1946. 

In the summer of 1946 she was placed in unmaintained reserve until 1948.  With the post-war economic difficulties of Britain hitting hard in 1947–1948 the reserve fleet was quickly sold off, and Suffolk was decommissioned and allocated to BISCO on 25 March 1948. She was towed to J Cashmore's (Newport, Wales) where she arrived on 24 June 1948 and scrapping began immediately.

Notes

References

External links

 HMS Suffolk at U-boat.net

 

Kent-class cruisers
County-class cruisers of the Royal Navy
Ships built in Portsmouth
1926 ships
World War II cruisers of the United Kingdom